Interstate 295 is the designation for several Interstate Highways in the United States:
Interstate 295 (Delaware–Pennsylvania), a bypass of Philadelphia, Pennsylvania
Interstate 295 (Florida), a beltway around central Jacksonville
Interstate 295 (Maine), an alternate route through and north of Portland
Interstate 295 (Maryland–District of Columbia), a connector route in Washington, D.C.
Interstate 295 (New York), a connector route in Queens and Bronx counties
Interstate 295 (North Carolina), a partially complete bypass of Fayetteville
Interstate 295 (Rhode Island–Massachusetts), a bypass of Providence, Rhode Island
Interstate 295 (Virginia), a bypass of Richmond and Petersburg

95-2
2